Phillip Van Dyke (born June 13, 1984) is an American former actor, best known for his role as the goblin Luke in the first two installments of Disney's Halloweentown film series and Arnold Shortman in seasons two and three of Nickelodeon's Hey Arnold!.

Career 
He had a role in the short-lived series The Home Court. He appeared once in a guest role in Dr. Quinn, Medicine Woman. He also had the title role in the short-lived Nickelodeon series Noah Knows Best. He also appeared as the sixteen-year-old Christopher Hayden on the show Gilmore Girls in the season three episode titled Dear Emily and Richard.

Phillip did also make an appearance on The Amanda Show. He became the voice of the lead character Arnold Shortman in the second season of Hey Arnold!, replacing Toran Caudell after the latter's voice changed. While he would be replaced by Spencer Klein after the third season for the same reason, he later made one-shot appearances as Sandy in the special Summer Love and more famously, Ludwig in the episode New Bully on the Block.

In a 2020 interview with E!, Van Dyke expressed interest in returning for another Halloweentown film if the rest of the cast also returned.

Filmography

Film

Television

References

External links 
 

1984 births
American male child actors
American male film actors
American male television actors
American male voice actors
Living people
Place of birth missing (living people)